Angus South (Gaelic: Aonghas a Deas) is a constituency of the Scottish Parliament (Holyrood) covering part of the council area of Angus. It elects one Member of the Scottish Parliament (MSP) by the first past the post method of election. In addition, it is one of ten constituencies in the North East Scotland electoral region, which elects seven additional members, in addition to the ten constituency MSPs, to produce a form of proportional representation for the region as a whole.

The seat was created for the 2011 Scottish Parliament election, and covers areas that were formerly in the seats of Angus and Tayside North, both of which were abolished. It has been held since creation by Graeme Dey of the Scottish National Party.

Electoral region

The other nine constituencies of the North East Scotland region are Aberdeen Central, Aberdeen Donside, Aberdeen South and North Kincardine, Aberdeenshire East, Aberdeenshire West, Angus North and Mearns, Banffshire and Buchan Coast, Dundee City East and Dundee City West.

The region covers all of the Aberdeen City council area, the Aberdeenshire council area, the Angus council area, the Dundee City council area and part of the Moray council area.

Constituency boundaries and council area 

Angus is represented by two constituencies in the Scottish Parliament: Angus North and Mearns and Angus South.

The electoral wards used in the creation of Angus South are:

Kirriemuir and Dean
Monifieth and Sidlaw
Carnoustie and District
Arbroath West, Letham and Friockheim
Arbroath East and Lunan

Member of the Scottish Parliament

Election results

2020s

2010s

References

External links

Scottish Parliament constituencies and regions from 2011
Politics of Angus, Scotland
Constituencies of the Scottish Parliament
Constituencies established in 2011
2011 establishments in Scotland
Kirriemuir
Arbroath
Carnoustie